The 1986 FIFA World Cup qualification UEFA Group 7 was a UEFA qualifying group for the 1986 FIFA World Cup. The group comprised Iceland, Scotland, Spain and Wales.

The group was won by Spain, who qualified for the 1986 FIFA World Cup. The runners-up Scotland entered the UEFA–OFC intercontinental play-off.

Standings

Results

Goalscorers

3 goals

 Mark Hughes
 Ian Rush

2 goals

 Mo Johnston
 Paul McStay
 Hipólito Rincón

1 goal

 Magnús Bergs
 Pétur Pétursson
 Guðmundur Þorbjörnsson
 Teitur Þórðarson
 Jim Bett
 Davie Cooper
 Kenny Dalglish
 Charlie Nicholas
 Emilio Butragueño
 Francisco José Carrasco
 Paco Clos
 Andoni Goikoetxea
 Rafael Gordillo
 Marcos Alonso Peña
 Manuel Sarabia
 Mickey Thomas

External links
Fifa.com page
Rsssf page
Results and Scorers

7
1984–85 in Scottish football
1985–86 in Scottish football
1984–85 in Spanish football
Qual
1984–85 in Welsh football
1985–86 in Welsh football
1985 in Icelandic football
1984 in Icelandic football
Qualification group